Zamel Essa Al-Kuwari (born 23 August 1973) is a Qatari footballer. He competed in the men's tournament at the 1992 Summer Olympics.

References

External links
 

1973 births
Living people
Qatari footballers
Qatar international footballers
Olympic footballers of Qatar
Footballers at the 1992 Summer Olympics
Place of birth missing (living people)
Qatar Stars League players
Al-Rayyan SC players
Al-Shamal SC players
Al Sadd SC players
Al-Muharraq SC players
Qatari expatriate footballers
Expatriate footballers in Bahrain
Qatari expatriate sportspeople in Bahrain
Association football defenders
Footballers at the 1994 Asian Games
Asian Games competitors for Qatar